The Ambassador Extraordinary and Plenipotentiary of the Russian Federation to the Republic of Cyprus is the official representative of the President and the Government of the Russian Federation to the President and the Government of Cyprus.

The ambassador and his staff work at large in the Embassy of Russia in Nicosia. The post of Russian Ambassador to Cyprus is currently held by Murat Zyazikov, incumbent since 12 September 2022.

History of diplomatic relations

Diplomatic relations at the mission level between the Soviet Union and Cyprus were first established in August 1960. The first ambassador, was appointed on 16 December 1960, and presented his credentials on 31 December 1960. With the dissolution of the Soviet Union in 1991, the Soviet ambassador, continued as representative of the Russian Federation until 1996.

List of representatives (1960 – present)

Representatives of the Soviet Union to Cyprus (1960 – 1991)

Representatives of the Russian Federation to Cyprus (1991 – present)

References

External links

 
Cyprus
Russia